Hunting Flies is a 1969 Polish comedy film directed by Andrzej Wajda. It was entered into the 1969 Cannes Film Festival.

Plot
Włodek (Zygmunt Malanowicz) is a young man who is stuck in a boring job in a library. He lives in a small apartment with his wife, son and in-laws. His family life is oppressive due to constant nagging by his wife, who wants to move to a bigger apartment. His father-in-law has an obsession with flies. His son is glued to the television set. Włodek's life changes when he meets a young woman, Irena (Małgorzata Braunek), who fascinates him with her striking appearance and impressive vocabulary. They set off on a short trip together. Their affair is more intellectual than physical. Irena seeks to control Włodek and make him a successful man as imagined by her. Włodek manages to regain control of his life just in time.

Cast
 Zygmunt Malanowicz - Włodek
 Małgorzata Braunek - Irena
 Ewa Skarzanka - Hanka, Włodek's wife
 Hanna Skarzanka - Hanka's mother
 Józef Pieracki - Hanka's father
 Daniel Olbrychski - Sculptor
 Irena Dziedzic - Journalist
 Leszek Drogosz - Militiaman
 Jacek Fedorowicz - Director
 Marek Grechuta - V.I.P.'s Son
 Irena Laskowska - Editor's Wife
 Julia Bratna - Girl
 M. Ziólkowski - Boy
 Leon Bukowiecki - Editor
 Krzysztof Burnatowicz

Reception 
The film, when released, was well received by some critics, which led to its being shortlisted for the Palme d'Or at Cannes. However, the portrayal of women in the film came in for adverse comments. One critic remarked: "the film's stale misogyny doesn't reflect well on [Wajda] ..." Accepting the criticism, Andrzej Wajda wrote later: "I willingly accepted Janusz Glowacki's film script without giving it much thought. Driven by frustration of temporary personal misadventures, I decided to settle the score with women who try to control men's lives. ... Unfortunately, my faculties were dimmed by my temporary disgust with women ... I lacked clear judgement and had to pay for it. ... what resulted was a fairly colourless film."

Hunting Flies has attracted critical attention as a film which is atypical of Wajda's work. As a 2016 reviewer writes: "With Hunting Flies Andrzej Wajda clearly deviated from his usual style and gave us a satiric bitter-sweet picture of young adults being trapped in various social deals, family issues, class system (still visible) – just like eponymous flies stuck to a flypaper."

References

External links

1969 films
1960s Polish-language films
1969 comedy films
Films directed by Andrzej Wajda
Polish comedy films